Viçens Ruiz Torruela (born 31 October 1991) is a Spanish field hockey player who plays as a midfielder for Real Club de Polo and the Spanish national team.

At the 2016 Summer Olympics, he competed for the national team in the men's tournament.

Club career
Ruiz played for Club Egara until 2016 when he moved to the Netherlands to play for HGC. He only played there for one season and returned to Club Egara. In 2019, after he won the Spanish national title with Club Egara he left them for Real Club de Polo.

International career
Ruiz has been playing for the national team since 2013 when he made his debut in 2013 EuroHockey Championships. He was part of the Spain squad that finished thirteenth at the 2018 World Cup. He scored one goal in three games in that tournament. At the 2019 EuroHockey Championship, he won his first medal with the national team as they finished second. On 25 May 2021, he was selected in the squad for the 2021 EuroHockey Championship.

References

External links

1991 births
Living people
Sportspeople from Terrassa
Spanish male field hockey players
Male field hockey midfielders
2014 Men's Hockey World Cup players
Field hockey players at the 2016 Summer Olympics
2018 Men's Hockey World Cup players
Field hockey players at the 2020 Summer Olympics
Olympic field hockey players of Spain
Club Egara players
HGC players
Real Club de Polo de Barcelona players
División de Honor de Hockey Hierba players
Men's Hoofdklasse Hockey players
Expatriate field hockey players
Spanish expatriate sportspeople in the Netherlands